Cliff Richards (born 1964, in Belo Horizonte, Brazil) is a Brazilian comic book artist.

Biography
Richards is best known as the penciller of the Buffy the Vampire Slayer monthly series from Dark Horse Comics, as well as the artist on the Buffy limited series, Haunted. He also penciled Sojourn #30 for CrossGen.
He has also worked on Birds of Prey, OMAC Project and Wonder Woman for DC Comics, and Rogue, Excalibur (vol. 3) and New Thunderbolts for Marvel Comics. Richards also illustrated the Huntress Year One miniseries for DC Comics. He is the artist of the Graphic novel from Del Rey Books and Jane Austen, Pride and Prejudice and Zombies.
He currently works for several DC Comics titles.
He is also working with Eric July on a new comic called ISOM.

Personal life
Richards lives in Belo Horizonte, Brazil.

References

1964 births
Living people
People from Belo Horizonte
American comics artists